Sema Parc Hotel is a 5-star hotel project in Bucharest.

External links
 Reference

Skyscrapers in Romania
Hotel buildings completed in 2010